Saint-Constant is a city in southwestern Quebec, Canada. It is located on the south shore of Montreal in the Roussillon Regional County Municipality of the Montérégie region. The population as of the Canada 2016 Census was 27,359.

History
Early settlement took place in 1725 as a result of the opening of the St. Pierre concession. The Côte Saint-Pierre mission (first name of the parish) began in 1750 with the construction of a church and two years later, the parish registers opened. Rang Saint-Pierre was the central concession of the Sault-Saint-Louis seigneurie and extended into the seigneurie of LaSalle. In 1815 Rang Saint-Pierre was nicknamed "Black Cattle Road" because it was the way cattle were transported from New York to Montreal. Centrally located in what was then Laprairie County, the village of Saint-Constant was the only location of voting from 1829 to 1841. Residents of the area witnessed or took part in the Lower Canada Rebellion of 1837-1838.

Local administrative structures emerged in Saint-Constant in 1845 with the introduction of the parish municipality and the school board. However, the vast territory of the parish of Saint-Constant was already subdivided for Saint-Rémi (1840), Saint-Édouard (1833), and Saint-Isidore (1833). This trend continued with the establishment of Saint-Michel (1854), Saint-Mathieu (1919) and Sainte-Thérèse-de-Delson (1932). One of the mayors, Solime Cardinal (1815–1897), was the maternal grandfather of Charles-Émile "Charley" Trudeau, a successful French Canadian entrepreneur who became the father of Pierre Elliott Trudeau, 15th Prime Minister of Canada, and grandfather of Justin Trudeau, 23rd and current Prime Minister of Canada.

Saint-Constant was transformed by the construction of the Canadian National Railway and Canadian Pacific Railway in the last quarter of the nineteenth century. The electrification of the village occurred around 1918 and rural electrification was completed in 1939. The Rue Saint-Pierre was extended from Montées des Bouleaux/Rue Sainte-Catherine, in the direction of Route 132 in 1950. Starting in the 1950s, suburban development occurred in Saint-Constant, allowing it to obtain city status in 1973.

Demographics 

Transportation
Local bus service in Saint-Constant is provided by the Réseau de transport métropolitain's Roussillon sector. Saint-Constant is also served by the Saint-Constant and Sainte-Catherine stations on the Réseau de transport métropolitain's Candiac line.

Attractions

Saint-Constant is home to the Canadian Railway Museum.

See also
Roussillon Regional County Municipality
Saint-Regis River
List of cities in Quebec

References

External links
 

 
Cities and towns in Quebec
Incorporated places in Roussillon Regional County Municipality
Canada geography articles needing translation from French Wikipedia